Baron  was a Japanese entrepreneur and hotelier.

Biography 
Baron Kishichiro Okura was son of Okura Kihachiro (1837-1928), an entrepreneur who built up the Okura-gumi and founded the giant Okura Zaibatsu (family owned conglomerate) and the Okura Shogyo Gakko, which later became Tokyo Keizai University (Tokyo University of Economics), in 1949.

Okura studied at Trinity College, Cambridge from 1903 to 1906 but did not graduate. He competed in the first ever car race held at Brooklands in Surrey on July 6, 1907, where he came in second. Okura was also one of the pioneers who introduced the motor car to Japan. He was President of the Imperial Hotel and Okura luxury hotel chain that is still important in Japan today.

Okura Kishichiro was a primary patron in the establishment of the Nihon Ki-in or Japanese Go Association in 1924, where he organized and supported professional go players in Japan following the Meiji Restoration and subsequent ceasing of government support for the four go houses.

He also invented the musical instrument the Okraulo, a type of vertical flute.

See also 

Kikuchi Dairoku
Suematsu Kenchō
Inagaki Manjirō
Anglo-Japanese relations
Japanese students in Britain

References

External links

 Reminiscences from the website of the Cambridge & Oxford Society, Tokyo
 Japanese Students at Cambridge University in the Meiji Era, 1868-1912: Pioneers for the Modernization of Japan, by Noboru Koyama, translated by Ian Ruxton.  Lulu Press, September 2004, 
 La Maison Italienne, musical composition in collaboration with Sekiya Toshiko to welcome the Italian Maestro Adolfo Gandino on his visit to Japan, April 1938

20th-century Japanese businesspeople
Japanese expatriates in the United Kingdom
Alumni of Trinity College, Cambridge
1882 births
1963 deaths
Businesspeople from Tokyo
Kazoku
Japanese racing drivers
Japanese racehorse owners and breeders
Japanese art collectors